William Thomas Jr. (1947–2020) is an American actor.

William Thomas Jr. may also refer to:
 William Thomas Jr. (child actor) or Billie "Buckwheat" Thomas (1931–1980), American actor
 William A. Thomas Jr. or Bill Thomas (born 1947), American politician from Alaska
 William Garfield Thomas Jr. (1916–1942), American naval officer
 William S. Thomas Jr. (1901–1986), American Episcopal bishop
 William W. Thomas Jr. (1839–1927), American diplomat and politician from Maine

See also 
 William Thomas (disambiguation)